Nogometni klub Lokomotiva Zagreb, commonly known as Lokomotiva Zagreb or simply Lokomotiva, is a Croatian professional football club based in Zagreb. It competes in the Croatian First Football League, the country's top division. Founded in 1914, the club's only period of success came in the late 1940s and early 1950s before spending most of the following five decades in lower-level leagues.

Between 2007 and 2009 they won three consecutive promotions to rise from the fourth level to the first in the Croatian football league system. They hosted their home matches at Stadion Maksimir for a couple of years before moving to Stadion Kranjčevićeva, as their own ground in the Novi Zagreb's Kajzerica neighbourhood is unsuitable for the top-level football.

History
NK Lokomotiva was founded as ŽŠK Victoria (Željezničarski športski klub "Victoria") in 1914.

After World War I, the name of the club was changed to Željezničar, under which they competed between the two wars. At that time, they were mostly in the shadow of the city's bigger clubs Građanski, Concordia and HAŠK. They played in the first level only in the 1940–41 season.

In 1945, the club was renamed Lokomotiva and soon their most productive years followed. They continuously played for 8 seasons (1947–1955) in the Yugoslav First League with the best league result in 1952, when they finished third, behind Hajduk Split and Red Star Belgrade. Some of the players at that time were Vladimir Čonč, Vladimir Firm, Drago Hmelina, Franjo Beserdi and Oto Bobek, younger brother of legendary Stjepan Bobek. They won Yugoslav Second League in 1956, but were relegated again from the First League in the summer of 1957 and never returned to the Yugoslav top flight again. They played in the Yugoslav Second League until 1970 and then also in the Yugoslav Inter-Republic League in the last years before the dissolution of Yugoslavia.

After Croatian independence and the formation of the Prva HNL in 1991, Lokomotiva played in the lower leagues of Croatian football, mostly spending their time in the Treća HNL. In 2006, before relegation to the fourth division, Lokomotiva became the feeder team for Dinamo Zagreb. This sparked a story of one of the most incredible rises through the leagues in Croatian football. Lokomotiva gained promotion in each of the next three season, finishing first in the Četvrta HNL in the 2006–07 season, second in the Treća HNL in the 2007–08 season, and third in the Druga HNL in the 2008–09 season.

The promotion from the second to the first division of Croatian football in 2009 meant that in the 2009–10 season, Lokomotiva would be back in the top flight for the first time after 52 years. The side recovered from a poor start in the league and finished in a respectable 8th position out of 16 teams, with notable victories 4–2 away against NK Zagreb, home 3–0 over Rijeka, and 2–1 over Hajduk Split. Their top scorer, Nino Bule, finished with 14 goals.

Due to rules against second sides being in the same division, they legally split their connection to Dinamo Zagreb. To meet the criteria for the Prva HNL, they played their games at Stadion Maksimir before moving on to Stadion Kranjčevićeva which is now the club's home. The club's base and youth teams area are located in Kajzerica neighborhood.

The 2012–13 season was one of the best in recent history for Lokomotiva. They finished in second place ahead of clubs such as Rijeka, Hajduk Split and RNK Split. Young star Andrej Kramarić, on loan from Dinamo Zagreb, finished second in the scoring charts with 15 goals. With the second-place finish, Lokomotiva qualified for the 2013–14 UEFA Europa League second qualifying round. In their first European encounter, the side faced FC Dinamo Minsk, losing on the away goals rule after winning 2–1 away from home, but losing 3–2 at home.

Lokomotiva established itself as a 1. HNL side, finishing between 4th and 6th place for the next six seasons. The club managed its first European aggregate victory over Airbus UK Broughton F.C. in the 2015–16 UEFA Europa League and navigating three stages of qualifying rounds in the 2016–17 UEFA Europa League, before losing 4–2 to Belgian Pro League side K.R.C. Genk in the playoff round.

In the 2019–20 season, which was interrupted by the COVID-19 pandemic, Lokomotiva had the best season in its history, finishing in second place in the league and finishing as runners-up in the Croatian Football Cup, losing 1–0 to Rijeka in the final. With Croatia's improved UEFA Ranking, this meant that Lokomotiva went into the 2020–21 UEFA Champions League qualifying rounds for the first time in its history, where it drew SK Rapid Wien in the second qualifying round.

Name changes
 ŽŠK Victoria (1914–1919)
 ŠK Željezničar (1919–1941)
 HŽŠK (1941–1945)
 FD Lokomotiva (1945–1946)
 FD Crvena Lokomotiva (1946–1947)
 NK Lokomotiva (1947–present)

Honours
Croatian football league system 
Croatian First League
 Runners-up (2): 2012–13, 2019–20
Croatian Second League
 Third place (1): 2008–09
Croatian Cup 
 Runners-up (2): 2012–13, 2019–20

Yugoslav football league system
Yugoslav First League
 Third place (1): 1952
Yugoslav Second League
 Champions (1): 1955–56 
 Runners-up (2): 1957–58, 1958–59

Crest and colours

Kit manufacturers and shirt sponsors

Players

Current squad

Dual registration

Out on loan

Recent seasons

European record

Summary

Source: uefa.com, Last updated on 7 September 2022Pld = Matches played; W = Matches won; D = Matches drawn; L = Matches lost; GF = Goals for; GA = Goals against. Defunct competitions indicated in italics.

Record by season

Personnel

Coaching staff

 Marko Grubić Ivan Rendulić

Coaching history

 Bogdan Cuvaj
 Hermenegildo Kranjc
 Sreten Ćuk (2007 – Dec 30, 2008)
 Ilija Lončarević (Jan 1, 2009 – Mar 6, 2009)
 Željko Pakasin (C) (Mar 7, 2009 – Apr 29, 2009)
 Roy Ferenčina (Apr 29, 2009 – Oct 3, 2010)
 Ljupko Petrović (Oct 3, 2010 – Mar 14, 2011)
 Krunoslav Jurčić (Mar 14, 2011 – May 26, 2011)
 Marijo Tot (Jun 1, 2011 – Oct 29, 2011)
 Ante Čačić (Oct 31, 2011 – Dec 23, 2011)
 Tomislav Ivković (Dec 23, 2011 – May 11, 2015)
 Marko Pinčić (C) (May 11, 2015 – Jun 3, 2015)
 Ante Čačić (Jun 3, 2015 – Sep 21, 2015)
 Sreten Ćuk (Sep 21, 2015 – May 30, 2016)
 Valentin Barišić (May 30, 2016 – Jul 6, 2016)
 Mario Tokić (C) (Jul 6, 2016 – Jul 25, 2016)
 Tomislav Ivković (Jul 25, 2016 – Nov 14, 2016)
 Mario Tokić (Nov 14, 2016 – Dec 5, 2017)
 Draženko Prskalo (C) (Dec 5, 2017 – Dec 27, 2017)
 Goran Tomić (Dec 27, 2017 – Jan 9, 2021)
 Jerko Leko (Jan 9, 2021 – Mar 13, 2021)
 Samir Toplak (Mar 14, 2021 – May 28, 2021)

References

External links

 
Lokomotiva profile at UEFA.com
Lokomotiva profile at Sportnet.hr 

Football clubs in Croatia
 
Lokomotiva
Lokomotiva
Lokomotiva
1914 establishments in Croatia
Railway association football teams